Lesley Choyce (born 21 March 1951) (m. Linda Choyce) is a Canadian author of novels, non-fiction, children's books, young adult novels, and poetry.

He is the author of more than 100 books for adults, teens and children, and teaches in the English department and transition year program at Dalhousie University.  He is a year-round surfer and founding member of the 1990s spoken word rock band The SurfPoets. Choyce also runs Pottersfield Press, a small literary publishing house. He hosted the national TV show Off The Page for many years. His books have been translated into Spanish, French, German and Danish, and he has been awarded the Dartmouth Book Award and the Ann Connor Brimer Award.

He lives at Lawrencetown Beach, Nova Scotia.

References

Canadian Who's Who.  Toronto: University of  Toronto Press, 1985, 1986, 1987, 1988, etc..
Contemporary Authors, Volume 130. Chicago: Gale Research, 1989.
Contemporary Authors, Volume 211. Chicago: Thompson Gale, 2004.  (feature biography).
Dictionary of International Biography. Cambridge: International Bibliographic Centre, 1999.
International Authors and Writers Who's Who. Cambridge: Int. Bibliographic Centre, 1996.
International Who's Who. London: Routledge, 2009.
Something About Authors. Chicago: Gale Research, 1997.
Who's Who in America. Chicago: Marquis Publishing, 1985. 
Who's Who of North American Poets. Cornwall, Ont.: Vesta Publishing, 1987.
Who's Who in Canadian Literature. Toronto: Reference Press, 1984, 1985, 1986, 1987, etc.
Who's Who in the World. Eight Ed. Wilmette, Ill.: Marquis, 1993.
Who's Who in Entertainment. New Providence, NJ: Marquis, 1997.

External links
 Lesley Choyce

1951 births
Living people
American emigrants to Canada
Canadian male novelists
20th-century Canadian poets
21st-century Canadian poets
20th-century Canadian novelists
21st-century Canadian novelists
Canadian children's writers
Graduate Center, CUNY alumni
Montclair State University alumni
Writers from Halifax, Nova Scotia
People from Riverside Township, New Jersey
Rutgers University alumni
Canadian male poets
20th-century Canadian male writers
21st-century Canadian male writers